Van Iersel  is a Dutch toponymic surname meaning "from/of Iersel", a regional spelling of the town Eersel in North Brabant. Variant forms are Van Ierssel and Van Irsel. Notable people with the surname include:

Annita van Iersel (born 1948), Australian painter
Kees van Ierssel (born 1945), Dutch football defender
Ludovicus M. M. Van Iersel (1893–1987), United States Army soldier and Medal of Honor recipient
Marleen van Iersel (born 1988), Dutch beach volleyball player

References

Dutch-language surnames
Toponymic surnames
Surnames of Dutch origin